The 1942 South Australian National Football League season was the second of three war-interrupted seasons.

Ladder

References 

SANFL
South Australian National Football League seasons